Bonnevaux Abbey is a former Cistercian monastery in Lieudieu near Villeneuve-de-Marc in the Isère department of France, in the region of the Dauphiné, 25 kilometres east of Vienne and about 6 kilometres south-east of Saint-Jean-de-Bournay on the northern edge of the Forêt de Bonnevaux.

History 
Bonnevaux Abbey was founded in 1117 by Guy of Burgundy, also known as Guy of Vienne, Archbishop of Vienne, and later Pope Callixtus II, as the sixth daughter house of Cîteaux Abbey.

The abbey attained wealth through various privileges and endowments, including a number from the Dauphin, and possessed fifteen granges in Villeneuve-de-Marc, Saint-Georges-d'Espéranche, Beaurepaire, Primarette, Sainte-Anne-sur-Gervonde and Diémoz. It founded numerous daughter houses, all in France: Mazan Abbey, Montpeyroux Abbey, Tamié Abbey, Léoncel Abbey, Valmagne Abbey, Sauveréal Abbey, Valbenoîte Abbey and Valcroissant Abbey. The nunneries of Laval-Bénite Abbey and Bonnecombe Abbey were also under the jurisdiction of Bonnevaux.

In the Wars of Religion of the 16th century the abbey suffered severely. In 1576 it was looted by the Huguenots and the church was laid waste. In the French Revolution it was dissolved, looted again, set on fire and finally used as a quarry.

Buildings and appurtenances 

A painting of about 1750 shows the precinct layout, with the church and its prominent western tower to the north, and the conventual buildings to the south of it. On the site of the monastery a memorial, consisting of a cross with an inscribed tablet, was set up in 1933 by Tamié Abbey.

In 1938 the foundation stones were used for the construction of the church at Villeneuve-de-Marc. Today there are no visible remains of the abbey itself; an outlying grange with three aisles survives.

References 
 Peugniez, Bernard, nd: Routier cistercien (2nd ed., p. 445). Moisenay: Editions Gaud. 
 Gerin, Patrick Gerin, and Pierry, Patrick: Les Granges à trois nefs de l'abbaye cistercienne de Bonnevaux en Dauphiné (Bulletin de la Société des amis de Vienne, Nr. 88, fasc. 1,  1993, pp. 22–25)
 Bernard, Michel, 2000: La Fin de l'abbaye de Bonnevaux au début de la Révolution française (Chroniques rivoises, n.E. 30, Nov. 2000, pp. 39–44)
 Chuzel, M.F., nd: Histoire de l’Abbaye de Bonnevaux (1932 edn., reprinted 2004). Ed. Lettres de France

External links 
Encyclopedie-Universelle de la Langue francaise: Abbaye de Bonnevaux 

Cistercian monasteries in France
1117 establishments in Europe
1110s establishments in France
18th-century disestablishments in France
Buildings and structures in Isère
Christian monasteries established in the 12th century